D’LIFE Home Interiors is an interior design company owned by JM Lifestyle Interior Projects Pvt. Ltd headquartered in Kochi, Kerala. D'LIFE was founded in 2013 by Joby Mathew.

Operation 
In the span of 19 years, D’LIFE Home Interiors has served 9000+ customers and launched 18 full-fledged branches across south India. The company is equipped with two expansive factories and a team of over 1,000 skilled workers capable of delivering 200 projects each month. D’LIFE imports about 80% of its raw materials and accessories from various countries including Germany, Italy, Switzerland, Austria, Indonesia, and Malaysia.

South India Expansion 
D’LIFE is looking to complete its 1st phase of south India expansion by the end of 2023, and is now in the process of setting up its showrooms in Mysore, Hyderabad and Visakhapatnam.

References 

Interior design firms
Interior designers